Gregg Burnett (born 24 May 1987) is a Scottish footballer who plays in midfield. He made one senior appearance for Dundee United in 2006, before playing for junior clubs Linlithgow Rose and Armadale Thistle.

Career
Burnett was born at Bangour, West Lothian and grew up in Livingston, where he attended Deans Community High School. He initially became attached to Dundee United at under-14 level. After captaining the club's under-16 team, he signed his first professional contract in June 2004, and thereafter was also United's under-19 captain.  Having become a regular member of the club's reserve team and being named as a first team substitute on several occasions, he was awarded his senior debut by manager Craig Brewster on 28 October 2006, playing from the start in a 5–1 defeat at Falkirk. It was Burnett's only senior appearance for the club after they announced he, along with Barry Callaghan, would be leaving at the end of the season.

Burnett signed for Linlithgow Rose in summer 2007, moving to Armadale Thistle the following year.

He was part of the Harvester AFC squad that competed in the Scottish Amateur Football Association Sunday Trophy Final in 2017.

References

External links
 

1987 births
Footballers from West Lothian
Living people
Scottish footballers
Dundee United F.C. players
Scottish Premier League players
Scottish Junior Football Association players
Armadale Thistle F.C. players
Linlithgow Rose F.C. players
Association football midfielders